Richard Schacht (born 1941) is an American philosopher and professor emeritus at the University of Illinois Urbana-Champaign now residing in Santa Fe, New Mexico.

He is an expert on the philosophy of Friedrich Nietzsche, was the editor of International Nietzsche Studies, and is former Executive Director of the North American Nietzsche Society. His philosophical interests include European philosophy after Kant, particularly Friedrich Nietzsche and Georg Wilhelm Friedrich Hegel, and concepts such as human nature, alienation, and value theory.

Publications

Authored

  (1971 paperback, Doubleday Anchor)
 British edition (hard cover and paperback): 1971 (London: George Allen & Unwin) Reprinted 1984: University Press of America; Reprinted 2015: Psychology Press

Hegel and After: Studies in Continental Philosophy Between Kant and Sartre (Pittsburgh: University of Pittsburgh Press, 1975), Pitt Paperback edition: 1975
Nietzsche (London: Routledge & Kegan Paul, 1983), Routledge Paperback ed.: 1985. Reissued 1994.
Classical Modern Philosophers: Descartes to Kant (London: Routledge & Kegan Paul, 1984). Reissued 1994.
The Future of Alienation (Urbana: University of Illinois Press, 1994)
Making Sense of Nietzsche (Urbana: University of Illinois Press, 1995)
Finding an Ending: Reflections on Wagner's Ring, with Philip Kitcher (Oxford University Press, 2004)

Edited
Nietzsche: Selections (New York: Macmillan, 1993)
Nietzsche, Genealogy, Morality (Los Angeles: University of California Press, 1994)
Human, All Too Human, by Friedrich Nietzsche, trans. R.J. Hollingdale (NY: Cambridge U P, 1996)

See also
 Nietzsche: Philosopher, Psychologist, Antichrist

References

External links
Homepage at the Philosophy department of the University of Illinois, Urbana-Champaign.

1941 births
20th-century American male writers
20th-century American non-fiction writers
20th-century American philosophers
20th-century essayists
21st-century American male writers
21st-century American non-fiction writers
21st-century American philosophers
21st-century essayists
American ethicists
American male essayists
American male non-fiction writers
Anthologists
Continental philosophers
Epistemologists
Historians of philosophy
Living people
Metaphysicians
Ontologists
Nietzsche scholars
Philosophers of culture
Philosophers of history
Philosophy academics
Philosophy writers
Princeton University alumni
Social philosophers
University of Illinois Urbana-Champaign faculty